Alan Reynolds may refer to:

 Alan Reynolds (economist) (born c. 1942), supply-side economist
 Alan Reynolds (footballer) (born 1974), Irish footballer and coach
 Alan Reynolds (artist) (1926–2014), British painter
 Alan Reynolds (darts player) (born 1960), Welsh darts player
 Alan Reynolds (cricketer) (1879–1940), English cricketer and British Army officer